Thricops is a genus of true flies of the family Muscidae.

Species

Thricops aculeipes (Zetterstedt, 1838)
Thricops albibasalis (Zetterstedt, 1849)
Thricops beckeri (Pokorny, 1892)
Thricops bukowskii (Ringdahl, 1934)
Thricops calcaratus (Porchinskiy, 1881)
Thricops coquilletti (Malloch, 1920)
Thricops culminum (Pokorny, 1889)
Thricops cunctans (Meigen, 1826)
Thricops diaphanus (Wiedemann, 1817)
Thricops fimbriatus (Coquillett, 1904)
Thricops foveolatus (Zetterstedt, 1845)
Thricops furcatus (Stein, 1916)
Thricops genarum (Zetterstedt, 1838)
Thricops hirtulus (Zetterstedt, 1838)
Thricops ineptus (Stein, 1920)
Thricops innocuus (Zetterstedt, 1838)
Thricops lividiventris (Zetterstedt, 1845)
Thricops longipes (Zetterstedt, 1845)
Thricops medius (Stein, 1920)
Thricops nigrifrons (Robineau-Desvoidy, 1830)
Thricops nigritellus (Zetterstedt, 1838)
Thricops rostratus (Meade, 1882)
Thricops rufisquamus (Schnabl, 1915)
Thricops semicinereus (Wiedemann, 1817)
Thricops separ (Zetterstedt, 1845)
Thricops septentrionalis (Stein, 1898)
Thricops simplex (Wiedemann, 1817)
Thricops spiniger (Stein, 1904)
Thricops sudeticus (Schnabl, 1888)
Thricops tarsalis (Walker, 1853)
Thricops tatricus Gregor, 1988
Thricops villicrura (Coquillett, 1900)
Thricops villosus (Hendel, 1903)

References

Muscidae
Diptera of North America
Diptera of Europe
Brachycera genera
Taxa named by Camillo Rondani